Bounty Nunatak is a prominent, largely ice-free nunatak,  high, located  southeast of Mount Burnham in the southern part of the Daniels Range, Usarp Mountains. The name was applied by the New Zealand Geological Survey Antarctic Expedition, 1963–64, because the party was out of food upon arrival at a food and fuel cache established near this nunatak.

References 

Nunataks of Oates Land